Volkswacht am Bodensee was a newspaper published from Romanshorn, Switzerland 1909-1934. Volkswacht was founded by Dr. Adolf Deucher. It functioned as a Free Democratic Party organ. The newspaper was edited by Enrico Tung. As of the late 1920s, it had a circulation of 1,600 copies.

References

1909 establishments in Switzerland
1934 disestablishments in Switzerland
Defunct newspapers published in Switzerland
Free Democratic Party of Switzerland
German-language newspapers published in Switzerland
Newspapers established in 1909
Publications disestablished in 1934